Vietnam–European Union relations are the multilateral relations between the Socialist Republic of Vietnam and the European Union (EU).

Diplomatic ties between Vietnam and the European Economic Community (EEC) were established in 1990. The legal basis of the bilateral relations between Vietnam and the EU was the Framework Cooperation Agreement, signed after the first meeting conducted by the Joint Commission in 1996. A Free Trade Agreement and an Investment Protection Agreement between both parts were signed on 30 June 2019. The EU–Vietnam Free Trade Agreement (EVFTA) was greenlighted by the European Parliament on 12 February 2020. Both the EVFTA and the Investment Protection Agreement (EVIPA) were ratified by the Vietnamese National Assembly on 8 June 2020.

See also 
 Foreign relations of the European Union
 Foreign relations of Vietnam

References 
Citations

Bibliography
 
 
 

EU
Third-country relations of the European Union